Ordens railway station was opened in 1859, its services restricted and renamed Ordens Platform railway station by 1911 and finally Ordens Halt railway station in 1924 with a restored service. The station was close to a farm of that name and served a very rural locality.  The line from  opened in 1859 and a temporary terminus opened on 30 July 1859 and a permanent station opened in 1860. There was a single platform.

The Great North of Scotland Railway (GNoS) took over the line in 1867 and operated it until grouping in 1923.  Passing into British Railways ownership in 1948, the line was, like the rest of the former GNoS lines along the Moray coast, considered for closure as part of the Beeching report and closure notices were issued in 1963.  Passenger services were withdrawn in 1964 and the entire line, including Banff station finally closed in 1968.

Station infrastructure
The station sat next to a road overbridge and in 1866 had a shelter and a siding with a loading dock. By 1902 the siding had been lifted and the loading dock abandoned, together with its entrance off the road, the station now being known as 'Ordens Platform', with a smaller shelter and no signalling indicated.
In 2011 the station hut and platform remained and the hut still had part of the name "Ordens" painted at the back.

Services
Opened as conditional halt in 1859 Ordens ceased to appear in the timetables by 1864. The station reappeared in Bradshaw's Guide between January 1917 and October 1920, but it may have remained as a conditional and unadvertised stop before this time. Ordens appeared in the LNER timetables from 14/7/24 and services continued until closure.

See also
List of Great North of Scotland Railway stations

References
Notes

Sources

External links
RailScot - Banff Portsoy and Strathisla Railway
GNoSR Blog

Disused railway stations in Aberdeenshire
Former Great North of Scotland Railway stations
Railway stations in Great Britain opened in 1863
Railway stations in Great Britain closed in 1964
Beeching closures in Scotland
1964 disestablishments in Scotland
1859 establishments in Scotland